Sickness Insurance (Agriculture) Convention, 1927 is  an International Labour Organization Convention.

It was established in 1927:
Having decided upon the adoption of certain proposals with regard to sickness insurance for agricultural workers,...

Modification 
The principles contained in this convention were subsequently revised and included in ILO Convention C130.

Ratifications
As of 2013, the convention has been ratified by 21 states. One state that has ratified, Uruguay, has subsequently denounced the treaty.

External links 
Text.
Ratifications.

Employee benefits
International Labour Organization conventions
Agriculture in society
Agricultural insurance
Treaties concluded in 1927
Treaties entered into force in 1928
Agricultural treaties
Treaties of the First Austrian Republic
Treaties of Bosnia and Herzegovina
Treaties of the Kingdom of Bulgaria
Treaties of Chile
Treaties of Colombia
Treaties of Croatia
Treaties of the Weimar Republic
Treaties of Haiti
Treaties of Luxembourg
Treaties of Montenegro
Treaties of the Netherlands
Treaties of Nicaragua
Treaties of Norway
Treaties of Peru
Treaties of the Polish People's Republic
Treaties of Serbia and Montenegro
Treaties of Slovenia
Treaties of the Second Spanish Republic
Treaties of North Macedonia
Treaties of the United Kingdom
Treaties of Yugoslavia
Occupational safety and health treaties
Treaties extended to Aruba
Treaties extended to the Netherlands Antilles
Treaties extended to Guernsey
Treaties extended to Jersey
Treaties extended to the Isle of Man
1927 in labor relations